Atlantic Park was a station on the Long Island Rail Road's former Far Rockaway Branch route in the Rockaways in Queens County, New York City, New York, United States. It has now been abandoned and destroyed.

Location Uncertainty  
Where the station was located is uncertain. Some sources label its placement as past Neptune House in or next to Belle Harbor, while some say it was located on Rockaway Freeway in between Edgemere and Far Rockaway stations or on Rockaway Freeway between Edgemere and South Side Pavilion stations, though the last two could very well be two descriptions of the same place.

History 
The station opened in May 1875. It closed sometime before 1929 (if its placement was near Edgemere) or 1901 (if its placement was past Neptune House.) It was not raised up above ground with the rest of the line as part of its grade-separation.

References 

Former Long Island Rail Road stations in New York City
Railway stations in the United States opened in 1875
Railway stations in Queens, New York